(English: This place), WAB 23, is a sacred motet composed by Anton Bruckner in 1869. The text is the Latin gradual Locus iste for the annual celebration of a church's dedication. The incipit, translates to "This place was made by God". It was the first motet that Bruckner composed in Vienna. It was published in 1886, together with three other gradual motets.

As a composition with no obvious technical difficulty, it has been performed by church choirs and by professionals, often to celebrate church dedications.

History 
Bruckner composed Locus iste on 11 August 1869. At that time Bruckner lived in Vienna, teaching at the Vienna Conservatory as a professor of harmony and counterpoint, and at the Vienna University as a part-time lecturer from 1876. He had a strong connection to the Old Cathedral of Linz, where he had been the organist from 1855 to 1868. He had already been commissioned by Bishop Franz-Josef Rudigier to compose a Festive Cantata for the laying of the foundation stone of the new cathedral, and composed Preiset den Herrn (Praise the Lord) on a text by Maximilian Pammesberger, which was performed on 1 May 1862 on the building site.

The Latin text of Locus iste is the gradual , part of the proper of the mass for Kirchweih, the anniversary of a church's dedication. While some sources claim that the motet was first performed on the dedication day, 29 September 1869, together with the first performance of Bruckner's Mass in E minor, it was actually performed four weeks later, on 29 October, at the same location. Bruckner dedicated the work to Oddo Loidol, one of his students at the Vienna Conservatory. It was Bruckner's first motet composed in Vienna.

Music 

The motet is scored for an unaccompanied mixed choir. It is in the key of C major and in common time, has 48 bars and takes about three minutes to perform. The text concentrates on the concept of the sacred place, based on the Biblical story of Jacob's Ladder, Jacob's saying "Surely the Lord is in this place; and I knew it not", and the story of the burning bush where Moses is told "put off thy shoes from off thy feet, for the place whereon thou standest is holy ground".

Bruckner structured the three lines of the text in an ABA da capo form, closed by a coda, with A containing the first line, framing the second and third. Peter Strasser suggests that the work reflects elements of architecture, such as in the symmetry of the da capo form and the use of motifs like building blocks.

The motet is marked Allegro moderato and begins calmly in homophony. Max Auer notes that the beautiful work has touches with Mozart's Ave verum. A. Crawford Howie notes further that the work "begins with Mozartian phrases, but soon introduces characteristic Brucknerian progressions". The repeat of the first line, beginning one step higher, is marked , confirming "" higher and stronger, then repeating it softly. The bass begins each "". Musicologist Anthony Carver notes here as in many of Bruckner's motets the "isolation of the bass part at structurally important points". The bass also begins the second line with a new rising motif, marked ; the upper voices follow in homophony. The line is repeated as a sequence a whole tone higher, marked . After a pause of half a bar, the tenor alone begins in sudden  the middle section on a repeated note, imitated by soprano and alto. Throughout the section, only the upper voices, without a bass foundation, sing in chromaticism, beginning in undefined tonality. Iso Camartin notes in an article dedicated to the work in the Neue Zürcher Zeitung: das unanfechtbare Geheimnis (the irreproachable mystery) appears as unfassbar (incomprehensible) and beunruhigend (disturbing), described by Ryan Turner as "transparently chromatic".

After another rest of half a bar, the first line is repeated. Instead of the last "", the word "" is extended to the only melisma of the otherwise austere, strictly syllabic composition. The author of the program notes for an Oratorio Society of New York CD that includes the motet writes that the melisma "spins an ethereal spell". It leads to a long general pause, achieved "by carefully measuring out five beats", before "" is repeated a final time, concluding "peacefully and serenely". The author of the Oratorio Society notes concludes by stating that " is a hauntingly beautiful work reminiscent of the quiet chapel it honored". Writing for Gramophone, Malcolm Riley called it "sublime (and deceptively difficult)".

Recordings 
The first recording of Bruckner's Locus iste occurred in the beginning of the 20th century:
 Karl Luze, Chor der Kaiserlichen Hofmusikkapelle – 78 rpm gramophone disc G.C./HMV 44762, c. 1907 (no sample of it currently available)

Over 200 recordings of Bruckner's Locus iste include:
 Matthew Best, Corydon Singers, Bruckner: Motets – CD: Hyperion CDA66062, 1982
 Philippe Herreweghe, la Chapelle Royale/Collegium Vocale, Ensemble Musique Oblique, Bruckner: Messe en mi mineur; Motets – CD: Harmonia Mundi France HMC 901322, 1989
 Frieder Bernius, Kammerchor Stuttgart, Bruckner: Mass in E minor; Ave Maria; Christus factus est; Locus iste; Virga Jesse – CD: Sony CL SK 48037, 1991
 John Eliot Gardiner, Monteverdi Choir, Bruckner: Mass No. 1; Motets – CD: DG 459 674–2, 1998
 Dan-Olof Stenlund, Malmö Kammarkör, Bruckner: Ausgewählte Werke – CD: Malmö Kammarkör MKKCD 051, 2004
 Petr Fiala, Tschechischer Philharmonischer Chor Brno, Anton Bruckner: Motets – CD: MDG 322 1422-2, 2006
 Ulf Samuelsson, Ungdomskören OPQ, Under höga valv – CD: Olaus Petri Församling OPCD001, 2006
 Michael Stenov, Cantores Carmeli, Benefizkonzert Karmelitenkirche Linz – CD/DVD issued by the choir, 2006, and on YouTube.
 Stephen Layton, Polyphony Choir, Bruckner: Mass in E minor & Motets – CD: Hyperion CDA 67629, 2007,
 Erwin Ortner, Arnold Schoenberg Chor, Anton Bruckner: Tantum ergo – CD: ASC Edition 3, issue of the choir, 2008
 Otto Kargl, Domkantorei St. Pölten, Bruckner: Messe E-Moll, CD: ORF CD 3174, 2013
 Philipp Ahmann, MDR Rundfunkchor Leipzig, Anton Bruckner & Michael Haydn – Motets – SACD: Pentatone PTC 5186 868, 2021

References

Sources 
 Anton Bruckner – Sämtliche Werke, Band XXI: Kleine Kirchenmusikwerke, Musikwissenschaftlicher Verlag der Internationalen Bruckner-Gesellschaft, Hans Bauernfeind and Leopold Nowak (Editor), Vienna, 1984/2001
 Uwe Harten, Anton Bruckner. Ein Handbuch. , Salzburg, 1996. 
 Cornelis van Zwol, Anton Bruckner 1824–1896 – Leven en werken, uitg. Thoth, Bussum, Netherlands, 2012.

External links 
 
 
 Locus iste C-Dur, WAB 23 Critical discography by Hans Roelofs  
 
 
 A live performance by Johannes Kleinjung with the Universitätschor, München (2011) can be heard on YouTube: Locus iste

1869 compositions
Motets by Anton Bruckner
Compositions in C major